Joseph M. Connolly (1924–2007) was an American police detective and politician who represented the 5th Middlesex District in the Massachusetts House of Representatives from 1983 to 1991.

References

1924 births
Democratic Party members of the Massachusetts House of Representatives
People from Natick, Massachusetts
2007 deaths
20th-century American politicians